In enzymology, a phosphonoacetaldehyde hydrolase is an enzyme that catalyzes the chemical reaction

phosphonoacetaldehyde + H2O  acetaldehyde + phosphate

Thus, the two substrates of this enzyme are phosphonoacetaldehyde and H2O, whereas its two products are acetaldehyde and phosphate.

This enzyme belongs to the family of hydrolases, specifically those acting on carbon-phosphorus bonds.  The systematic name of this enzyme class is 2-oxoethylphosphonate phosphonohydrolase. Other names in common use include phosphonatase, and 2-phosphonoacetylaldehyde phosphonohydrolase.  This enzyme participates in aminophosphonate metabolism.

Structural studies

References

External links

EC 3.11.1
Enzymes of known structure